Frances Ford Seymour Fonda (4 April 1908 – 14 April 1950) was a Canadian-American socialite. She was the second wife of actor Henry Fonda, and the mother of actors Jane Fonda and Peter Fonda.

Biography 
Born in Brockville, Ontario, Canada, Seymour was the daughter of Sophie Mildred (née Bower) and Eugene Ford Seymour. According to her daughter, Jane, medical records revealed that Seymour was a victim of recurrent sexual abuse in her childhood.

On 10 January 1931, she married George Tuttle Brokaw, a millionaire lawyer and sportsman. They had one child, Frances de Villers "Pan" Brokaw (10 October 1931 – 10 March 2008). 

A year after Brokaw died, Seymour married actor Henry Fonda on 16 September 1936, at Christ Church, New York City. She had met Fonda at Denham Studios in England on the set of the film Wings of the Morning. The couple had two children, actress Jane (born 21 December 1937) and actor Peter (23 February 1940 – 16 August 2019), but their marriage was troubled. According to Peter Fonda, these difficulties later gave him empathy for the marital problems of actor Dennis Hopper, his co-star in the 1969 film Easy Rider.

Seymour died by suicide while she was a patient at the Austen Riggs Center. Her suicide came three and a half months after Fonda asked her for a divorce. She is buried in Ogdensburg Cemetery, Ogdensburg, New York.

References

External links
 
 "Mothers, Lost and Found" The Washington Post, Abigail Trafford, May 3, 2005
 Excerpt: 'My Life So Far' ABC News, April 5, 2005

1908 births
1950 suicides
Canadian emigrants to the United States
Fonda family
Canadian socialites
Suicides by sharp instrument in the United States
Suicides in New York (state)
People from Brockville
Austen Riggs Center patients